Flight Lieutenant William Geoffrey Meggitt  (8 April 1894 – 28 January 1927) was a British World War I flying ace credited with six aerial victories.

World War I

Meggitt was commissioned as a second lieutenant (on probation) in the 3rd Battalion, Welsh Regiment, on 31 March 1915, and was confirmed in his rank on 2 November. He was later seconded to the Royal Flying Corps, and was appointed a flying officer (observer) on 28 October 1916.

Posted to No. 25 Squadron RFC, flying the F.E.2b two-seater fighter Meggitt gained his first aerial victories on 22 October 1916, destroying two Type D aircraft, the first with Sergeant William Drummond Matheson early in the morning south-west of Seclin, and another in the late afternoon north-west of Lille with Second Lieutenant D. S. Johnson. On 17 November 1916 he took part in the destruction by fire of an enemy aircraft over Vitry, piloted by Captain R. Chadwick, and shared with Second Lieutenant H. Dunlop & Lieutenant Harry Scandrett, Second Lieutenant D. S. Johnson & Lieutenant I. Heald, Second Lieutenant H. L. Chadwick & Second Lieutenant C. J. Butler, Sergeant James Green & Corporal A. G. Bower. On 15 February 1917, with Captain Lancelot Richardson, he drove down out of control a Type C aircraft over Avion.

Meggitt was transferred from the Special Reserve to Regular Army on 31 March 1917, and was also awarded the Military Cross, which was gazetted on 17 April 1917. His citation read:
2nd Lieutenant William Geoffrey Meggitt, Welsh Regiment, Special Reserve and Royal Flying Corps.
"For conspicuous gallantry and devotion to duty whilst one of a patrol engaging five hostile machines. He drove down one enemy machine and then attacked another, which was seen to go down vertically. He has previously brought down three hostile machines."

He then trained as a pilot, and was appointed a flying officer on 8 June 1917. Promoted to lieutenant on 1 July, he was posted to No. 22 Squadron RFC, flying the two-seater Bristol Fighter. He gained his fifth aerial victory on 10 October, destroying an Albatros D.V over Moorslede with observer Air Mechanic 1st Class Arch Whitehouse. The next day, with Captain F. A. Durrad as his observer he drove down another D.V.

Meggitt was shot down on 8 November 1917, and initially listed as missing in action, but was eventually reported as being a prisoner of the Germans in early 1918.

Post World War I
Meggitt was repatriated following the Armistice of 11 November 1918, and on 1 August 1919 was granted a permanent commission in the Royal Air Force with the rank of lieutenant, resigning his commission in the Welsh Regiment the same day.

On 2 January 1922, in the 1922 New Year Honours, Meggitt was promoted from flying officer to flight lieutenant. He evidently served for some time overseas, as on 22 September 1923 he was posted to the School of Photography for course in engineering at the Royal Aircraft Establishment on his transfer to the Home Establishment. He was posted to the RAF Depot on 1 September 1924, and on 6 September 1926 to the Station headquarters at RAF Upavon.

Meggitt was attached to No. 41 Squadron RAF on 28 January 1927 to undertake flight trial of Siskin III, J7171. Flying from Northolt to Kenley, he lost control during a gale and crashed in the garden of a house at 11 Beatrice Ave, Norbury, London SW. He was removed from the aircraft unconscious but died of his injuries underway to Croydon General Hospital.

References

Bibliography
 Franks, Norman; Guest, Russell; Alegi, Gregory (2008). Above The War Fronts: A Complete Record of the British Two-seater Bomber Pilot and Observer Aces, the British Two-seater Fighter Observer Aces, and the Belgian, Italian, Austro-Hungarian and Russian Fighter Aces, 1914–1918. Grub Street Publishing. , 

1894 births
1927 deaths
Aviators killed in aviation accidents or incidents in England
British World War I flying aces
British World War I prisoners of war
Formerly missing people
Missing in action of World War I
People from Newport, Wales
Recipients of the Military Cross
Royal Flying Corps officers
Victims of aviation accidents or incidents in 1927
Welch Regiment officers
World War I prisoners of war held by Germany